Zammuto may refer to:

 Zammuto (band), an American indie rock band
 Zammuto (album)